The Henry Brabham Cup is the trophy awarded annually by the ECHL to the team that finishes with the most points in the league during the regular season. The Brabham Cup has been awarded 33 times to 16 different franchises since its debut in 1989.

History
Unlike the playoff championship, which was originally awarded with the Riley Cup and now the Kelly Cup, the trophy was introduced during the league's inaugural season in 1988 by the league's board of governors and was named after in recognition of Henry Brabham, who co-founded the ECHL in 1988–89 with five teams in four states. Brabham, who was the first inductee into the ECHL Hall of Fame in 2008, owned three of the original five teams. The Virginia businessman was crucial to the league surviving its earliest seasons.

Only five Brabham Cup winners have gone on to win the ECHL Kelly Cup playoff championship, with the Alaska Aces doing so three times, despite the guaranteed home-ice advantage in all rounds of the playoffs.

Seven franchises — the Alaska Aces, Cincinnati Cyclones, Florida Everblades, Knoxville Cherokees franchise (including the Pee Dee Pride), Louisiana IceGators, Toledo Storm franchise (including Toledo Walleye), and the Thunderbirds/Nailers franchise (the Winston-Salem Thunderbirds and the Wheeling Thunderbirds/Nailers) have won the Brabham Cup on multiple occasions, with the Aces and Storm/Walleye winning five times, the Everblades winning four, the former Cherokees/Pride and Thunderbirds/Nailers franchises having won three each, while the others have two.

Winners 

Defunct franchises are listed in italics.

Notes
1.   Results based on points percentage, not total points, as teams ceased operations mid-season and not all teams played 72 games.
2.   The South Carolina Stingrays and the Florida Everblades were both tied at 92 points after 62 games were played when the ECHL announced that the remainder of its 2019–20 season would not be played due to the COVID-19 pandemic.
3.   Due to the ongoing COVID-19 pandemic, teams played an imbalanced schedule and the regular season championship was awarded based on points percentage.

See also
Kelly Cup
ECHL

References

ECHL trophies and awards